Head Down is the third studio album by the blues rock band Rival Sons. The album was released on September 17, 2012 in the UK and was released in the rest of Europe on September 14, 2012. It is the last Rival Sons album recorded by the original line-up, prior to bass player Robin Everhart's departure in August 2013.

Critical reception

Head Down has been met with mostly positive reviews. William Clark of Guitar International wrote, "Rival Sons have rocketed back on to our radar with their new album, Head Down, and despite the title it shows the band heading nowhere but up." Greg Moffitt of BBC praised the band for their craftsmanship of 60s and 70s blues and hard rock music reminiscent of Led Zeppelin, Deep Purple and The Doors, saying that the album "honours half a century of classic rock with reverence, respect and the realisation that this music’s still happening, right now." AllMusic's Jon O'Brien admired the collaboration between the band and Dave Cobb for bringing "a sense of adventure" to their recreation of the Zeppelin sound, saying that "there's much to enjoy on this typically ballsy and no-nonsense follow-up to 2011 breakthrough Pressure & Time."

Track listing

Personnel
Rival Sons
 Jay Buchanan – vocals
 Scott Holiday – guitars
 Robin Everhart – bass
 Michael Miley – drums

Charts

References

2012 albums
Earache Records albums
Rival Sons albums
Albums produced by Dave Cobb